Ascalenia revelata is a moth in the family Cosmopterigidae. It was described by Edward Meyrick in 1922. It is found in Brazil.

References

Moths described in 1922
Ascalenia
Moths of South America